The 2002 UCI Road World Championships took place in the region of Limburg, Belgium, between 8 and 13 October 2002. The event consisted of a road race and a time trial for men, women, men under 23, junior men and junior women.

Events summary

External links 
Results and report of cyclingnews.com

 
UCI Road World Championships by year
World Championships
Uci Road World Championships, 2002
International cycle races hosted by Belgium
Sport in Hasselt
Circuit Zolder